Tomasz Rebisz (born 2 February 1974) is a Paralympian athlete from Poland competing mainly in F46 classification throwing events. The decision by the International Paralympic Committee to remove his classification form the Paralympic programme between 1998 and 2010 meant Rebisz had a gap of 16 years between winning medals at the 1996 Summer Paralympics in Atlanta and the 2012 Summer Paralympics in London.

Athletics history
Rebisz was always interested in sport but took up athletics seriously in 1992. He was selected for the Poland national team at the 1996 Summer Paralympics in Atlanta, entering the shot put, javelin and discus throw events in the F46 classification. He won medals in all three, silver in the discus and shot put and bronze in the javelin. He followed this with three more medals at the 1998 IPC Athletics World Championships in Birmingham, including gold in the shot put. The International Paralympic Committee then decided to remove all F46 throwing event from their Paralympic schedule, leaving Rebisz unable to compete at the highest level of his sport.

In the run-up to the 2012 Summer Paralympics in London the IPC chose to reinstate the F46 classification to their programme. Rebisz felt cheated by the original decision to remove the T46 category and when discussing the reintroduction he stated that "I felt like someone had done it to annoy me,". He entered the 2011 IPC Athletics World Championships in Christchurch, competing in the shot and discus. He came sixth in the shot put, but won gold in the discus. At London, he entered the only event available to him, the shot put, as his favoured discus event was not contested in the F46. He recorded a season's best of 15.01 metres, which was enough to win Rebisz a bronze, his first Paralympic medal in 16 years.

Personal history
Rebisz was born in Koszalin, Poland in 1974. He has a daughter.

Notes

Paralympic athletes of Poland
Athletes (track and field) at the 1996 Summer Paralympics
Athletes (track and field) at the 2012 Summer Paralympics
Paralympic bronze medalists for Poland
Paralympic silver medalists for Poland
Living people
Medalists at the 1996 Summer Paralympics
Medalists at the 2012 Summer Paralympics
Polish male discus throwers
Polish male javelin throwers
Polish male shot putters
People from Koszalin
1974 births
Paralympic medalists in athletics (track and field)
20th-century Polish people
21st-century Polish people
Paralympic discus throwers
Paralympic javelin throwers
Paralympic shot putters
Medalists at the World Para Athletics Championships
Medalists at the World Para Athletics European Championships